Frigoribacterium endophyticum is a Gram-positive and non-motile bacterium from the genus Frigoribacterium which has been isolated from the roots of the plant Anabasis elatior from Urumqi in China.

References

Microbacteriaceae
Bacteria described in 2015